Neusäß (English transcription: Neusaess, Swabian: Neisäß) is a town in the District of Augsburg, Bavaria, Germany. The town lies on the Schmutter river and borders the city of Augsburg. , the city had 22,164 inhabitants.

Town districts

 Alt-Neusäß
 Hainhofen
 Hammel
 Westheim
 Schlipsheim
 Täfertingen
 Ottmarshausen
 Steppach

History
Neusaess is a union from 8 formerly independent villages, which united in the years 1972 and 1977, in order to avoid the threatening incorporation by Augsburg.

Since 2014, Richard Greiner (CSU) has been mayor of Neusäß.

Attractions

 Pilgrimage church Maria Loreto on the Kobel (Westheim)
 Schloss Hainhofen
 Schloss Hamel
 Bismarckturm (Steppach)
 Titania hot springs
 Schmutter

Twin towns — Sister cities
Neusäß is twinned with:
   Cusset, France
   Eksjö, Sweden
   Markkleeberg, Germany
   Bracciano, Italy

Notable people 
 Sena Jurinac (1921–2011), Lederle, soprano and member of the Viennese Mozart ensemble, lived from 1973 until her death in Hainhofen

References

External links
 

Augsburg (district)